Triammatus is a genus of longhorn beetles of the subfamily Lamiinae, containing the following species:

 Triammatus brunneus Breuning, 1947
 Triammatus chevrolati Pascoe, 1856
 Triammatus saundersii Chevrolat, 1856
 Triammatus subinermis Breuning, 1955
 Triammatus tristis Pascoe, 1860
 Triammatus waigeuensis Gilmour, 1950

References

Lamiini